The 2017–18 Cal State Bakersfield Roadrunners men's basketball team represented California State University, Bakersfield during the 2017–18 NCAA Division I men's basketball season. The Roadrunners, led by seventh-year head coach Rod Barnes, played their home games at the Icardo Center as members of the Western Athletic Conference. They finished the season 12–18, 5–9 in WAC play to finish in a tie for sixth place. They lost in the quarterfinals of the WAC tournament to Utah Valley.

Previous season 
The Roadrunners finished the 2016–17 season 25–10, 12–2 in WAC play to win the regular season WAC championship. They defeated Utah Valley to advance to the championship game of the WAC tournament where they lost to New Mexico State. As a regular season conference champion who failed to win their conference tournament, they received an automatic bid to the National Invitation Tournament. As a No. 8 seed, they defeated California, Colorado State, and Texas–Arlington to become the first No. 8 seed to advance to the semifinals since the NIT introduced seeding in 2006. In the semifinals at Madison Square Garden they lost to Georgia Tech.

Offseason

Departures

Incoming transfers

2017 recruiting class

2018 recruiting class

Roster

Schedule and results

|-
!colspan=9 style=| Exhibition

|-
!colspan=9 style=| Non-conference regular season

|-
!colspan=9 style=| WAC regular season

|-
!colspan=9 style=| WAC tournament

References

Cal State Bakersfield Roadrunners men's basketball seasons
Cal State Bakersfield